Taylor College and Seminary is a private Baptist university and seminary in Edmonton, Alberta, Canada. It is part of Kairos University. It is also affiliated with the North American Baptist Conference.

History
The college was established in 1940 as the Christian Training Institute. In 1949 the school became affiliated to the North American Baptist Conference. It was accredited by the Department of Education of Alberta in 1952. A divinity school was added in 1958.

The institution moved from its original location near the U of A to its present location on 23 Avenue in 1968. With the help of the alumni association, a 28-acre campus was purchased, and a major building program was carried out in 1968, including an administration building, two dormitories and the Student Union Building, at a cost of over $1,000,000. The institute was renamed North American Baptist College and endorsed by the Accrediting Association of Bible Colleges the same year. On July 29, 1988, the college signed an affiliation agreement with the University of Alberta, which remained in place for a number of years.

An accredited "university college" began offering undergraduate programs in 2002, and the school changed its name to Taylor University College and Seminary. The undergraduate programs were ended in June 2009. Taylor Seminary continues to operate, and the E P Wahl Centre began offering non-credit educational programs in 2008–2009; a Conservatory of Music was added in 2010.

In 2010, a large portion of the campus was sold and is now home to CDI College.

A history of Taylor was written by former president J. Walter Goltz in 2009, titled For God and Truth. An addendum to that book (For God and Truth: An Update), covering the recent changes at the institution, is available online.

In 2021, it became a founding member of the university network Kairos University.

Academics
Taylor Seminary offers the Master of Divinity, Master of Theological Studies, Master of Arts, and several diplomas and certificates.

See also

List of universities and colleges in Alberta
List of evangelical seminaries and theological colleges

References

External links

 

Universities and colleges in Edmonton
Colleges in Alberta
Baptist seminaries and theological colleges in Canada
Kairos University